BE9 or BE-9 may refer to:

 Beryllium-9 (Be-9 or 9Be), an isotope of beryllium
 Royal Aircraft Factory B.E.9, a British aircraft of World War I